Fish head casserole is a seafood dish from Jiangsu province in China. It is named for its main ingredient, fish heads, which are cooked in a casserole.

Ingredients 
The dish includes a fish head (about 1 kg), tofu, cayenne pepper, sesame oil, vegetable oil, garlic sprouts, shallot, ginger, soy, salt, cooking wine, white sugar and monosodium glutamate.

Preparation 
The head is washed, marinated in soy sauce, and fried with added cooking wine. The head is stewed and served garnished with garlic sprouts and sesame oil. The broth in this dish has a milky white colour. This dish is famous because of its delicious taste and nutrition. This dish was famous only in China until 1982. After it was served to diplomatic envoys and spouses, it became known in other parts of the world. Fish head casserole was invented in the Tian Mu Lake area.

See also
 Cuisine of China
 List of casserole dishes

References

Fish dishes
Casserole dishes
Chinese seafood dishes